BondMason is a direct lending (including peer-to-peer lending) investment manager based in Harpenden, England.

History 
BondMason was founded in 2013  by Stephen Findlay an accountant with a background in private equity who previously worked at Fidelity Equity Partner and was one of the first companies accepted onto the Financial Conduct Authority's (FCA) Innovation Hub programme.

The platform officially launched in October 2015.

In 2016, BondMason completed an equity funding round led by Par Equity, a venture capital firm based in Edinburgh, Scotland.  In March 2018, the company secured £1.85 million in another funding round led by Seneca Partners and Par Equity.

Business Model and Activities
BondMason enables clients to access returns from direct lending, mostly loans secured against UK property.  Investment services that it offers include bonds and investment funds.

The company also produces proprietary research into direct lending market trends, including identifying the market size and growth in peer-to-peer lending in the UK from £2.3bn in 2015 to £3.2bn in 2016.

References

External sources
 BondMason - Homepage

Financial services companies of England
2013 establishments in the United Kingdom
Financial services companies established in 2013
Peer-to-peer lending companies
Companies based in the City and District of St Albans
Harpenden